Jach'a K'uchu (Aymara jach'a big, k'uchu, q'uch'u corner, "big corner", Hispanicized spelling Jachacucho) is a mountain in the Andes of Peru, about  high. It is located in the Moquegua Region, Mariscal Nieto Province, Carumas District, and in the Puno Region, El Collao Province, Santa Rosa District. It lies southwest of Qiwña Milluku and northwest of Kurawara (Curahuara). The Janq'u Jaqhi River ("white cliff", Jancoaque) originates on the east side of the mountain. It flows to the southeast.

References

Mountains of Moquegua Region
Mountains of Puno Region
Mountains of Peru